France has participated in the Junior Eurovision Song Contest six times, debuting in Lillehammer, Norway, at the Junior Eurovision Song Contest 2004. France Télévisions, a member organisation of the European Broadcasting Union (EBU), is responsible for the selection process of their participation. The first representative to participate for the nation was Thomas Pontier with the song "Si on voulait bien", which finished in sixth place out of eighteen participating entries, achieving a score of seventy-eight points.

Contest history
France has participated in the Junior Eurovision Song Contest six times since their debut at the Junior Eurovision Song Contest 2004. Their first entry in the contest was the song "Si on voulait bien" performed by Thomas Pontier. To select the entry, a national final was held at France Televisions studios in Paris. 7,000 children auditioned for the event, and an extra 1,000 were invited to the final. By the end, 11 candidates became the finalists, with Pontier winning the competition with his cover of Téléphone's song "Un autre monde". His song for Junior Eurovision, "Si on voulait bien", was later released on 7 October along with a music video. Despite placing sixth out of the 18 participants, France Télévisions opted to not participate after 2004, saying there was no motivation to compete and that "too much Eurovision kills Eurovision".

On 18 November 2015, it was revealed that the French broadcaster was interested in returning to the contest. However, France 2 announced on 24 June 2015 that they had no plans to return to the contest, though the broadcaster sent a delegation to Bulgaria in order to observe the 2015 edition. On 13 May 2016, executive supervisor Jon Ola Sand announced at a press conference, that the EBU were in contact with broadcasters from several countries including France, so that they would participate in the 2016 contest. Edoardo Grassi, the Head of Delegation for France in the Eurovision Song Contest was one of the jury members at the Maltese national selection for the 2016 Junior Eurovision, and was introduced by the hosts of the show as being the Head of Delegation for France in the Junior Eurovision Song Contest. The return however did not materialise. On 12 May 2018, it was announced that France would return to the contest in 2018, with the nation represented by Angélina Nava, winner of the fourth season of The Voice Kids France, who was internally selected as the entrant. Her song "Jamais sans toi" was drawn to perform fifteenth on 25 November 2018, following Israel and preceding Macedonia, eventually placing second at the contest with 203 points. For the 2019 contest, France was represented by Carla with the song "Bim bam toi". During the opening ceremony and the running order draw which both took place on 18 November 2019, France was drawn to perform second on 24 November 2019, following Australia and preceding Russia. At the conclusion of the event, the entry placed fifth with 169 points.

On 8 October 2020, France 2 selected 11-year old Valentina to represent the country at the  contest in Warsaw, Poland, with her song later announced to be called "J'imagine". On 29 November 2020, Valentina became the first French entrant to win the contest, giving France their first victory as well as their first win in any Eurovision event since Eurovision Young Dancers 1989. On 9 December 2020, it was confirmed by the EBU that France would host the 2021 contest. France opted for an internal selection for the Junior Eurovision Song Contest 2021 and was represented by French hip-hop and R&B singer Henzo Hilaire (born 26 November 2008), better known by his stage name Enzo. His selected song was "Tic Tac", which was released at midnight on 22 October. It was written and composed by Alban Lico, and was described as "an invitation to take a break to enjoy simple things far from our hectic and hyperconnected lives", according to France 2. During the opening ceremony and the running order draw, which both took place on 19 December 2021, host country France was drawn to perform thirteenth on 19 December 2021, following Ukraine and preceding Azerbaijan. At the end of the contest, France received 187 points, placing 3rd out of 19 participating countries. 

On 28 October 2022, Lissandro Formica was announced as the French entrant at the Junior Eurovision Song Contest 2022 with the song "Oh maman!". After the opening ceremony for the 2022 contest, which took place on 5 December 2022, it was announced that France would perform sixth on 11 December 2022, following Italy and preceding Albania. The entry won the contest with "Oh maman!" accumulating 203 points and placing first of the 16 participating nations. The French head of delegation Alexandra Redde-Amiel and Director General of France Télévisions Delphine Ernotte then revealed that the country would host the next edition of the contest in 2023.

Participation overview

Commentators and spokespersons
The contests are broadcast online worldwide through the official Junior Eurovision Song Contest website junioreurovision.tv and YouTube. In 2015, the online broadcasts featured commentary in English by junioreurovision.tv editor Luke Fisher and 2011 Bulgarian Junior Eurovision Song Contest entrant Ivan Ivanov. The French broadcaster, France Télévisions, sent their own commentators to the contest in order to provide commentary in the French language. Spokespersons were also chosen by the national broadcaster in order to announce the awarding points from France. The table below list the details of each commentator and spokesperson since 2004.

Hostings

See also
 France in the Eurovision Song Contest – Senior version of the Junior Eurovision Song Contest.
 France in the Eurovision Young Dancers – A competition organised by the EBU for younger dancers aged between 16 and 21.
 France in the Eurovision Young Musicians – A competition organised by the EBU for musicians aged 18 years and younger.

Notes

References

Countries in the Junior Eurovision Song Contest
French music